The Nigerian National Assembly delegation from Delta comprises three Senators representing Delta Central, Delta South, Delta North and ten Representatives representing Ethiope, Ughelli North/South/Udu, Ndokwa/Ukwani, Okpe/Sapele/Uvwie, Isoko North/South, Burutu, Warri, Ika, Aniocha North/South, and Bomadi/Patani.

Fourth Republic

The 9th Parliament (2019 - 2023)

The 4th Parliament (1999 - 2003)

References
Official Website - National Assembly House of Representatives (Delta State)
 Senator List

Politics of Delta State
National Assembly (Nigeria) delegations by state